Castercliff is an Iron Age multivallate hillfort situated close to the towns of Nelson and Colne in Lancashire, Northern England.


It is located on a hilltop overlooking the valley system of the River Calder and its tributaries, on the western edge of the South Pennines. On this side the defences consist mainly of a single rampart and ditch, but some short lengths of triple rampart and ditch are also found here.

Streams spring from either side of the ridge and the deep valleys which they have cut, especially on the south, offer additional defence.

Excavations during the 1970s appear to show that the site was not completed, and no evidence of occupation was unearthed. The site is a Scheduled Ancient Monument.

The hillfort has been damaged by coal mining with old bell pits evident both inside and around the site.

Media gallery

See also 
Scheduled monuments in Lancashire

References

External links 

Aerial view and description

Hill forts in Lancashire
Scheduled monuments in Lancashire
Buildings and structures in the Borough of Pendle
Nelson, Lancashire